Rodrigo Arús (born 20 February 1995) is an Uruguayan tennis player.

Arús has a career high ATP singles ranking of 1190 achieved on 10 November 2014. He also has a career high ATP doubles ranking of 1453 achieved on 18 December 2017.

Arús represents Uruguay at the Davis Cup, where he has a W/L record of 1–4.

External links

1995 births
Living people
Uruguayan male tennis players
Tennis players at the 2015 Pan American Games
Pan American Games competitors for Uruguay